1000 times may refer to:
 "1000×", a 2016 song by Jarryd James
 "1000 Times", a song by Gomez from the 2002 album In Our Gun
 "1,000 Times", a song by Tahiti 80 from the 2002 album Wallpaper for the Soul
 1000X (EP), by Man or Astro-man?, 1997

See also

1000 (disambiguation)